John McLean (born 22 May 1872) was a Scottish footballer who played as a defender for Liverpool in The Football League.

McLean signed for Liverpool from the Scottish junior ranks during the 1894–95 Football League season as reinforcement for their defence which was not performing well. He made his debut against Stoke in a 3–1 defeat, and made a further 20 appearances that season. He featured less in the following campaign as the only two positions he could play (right and left back) were occupied, so he made a total of eight more appearances for Liverpool before he left in 1897.

He thereafter moved around several clubs, mainly being used in the centre half position, firstly to Grimsby Town (where he was brought in as a replacement for Sandy Higgins), and later Bristol City, Bristol Rovers, Millwall and Queens Park Rangers, winning the 1907–08 Southern Football League title with the West Londoners and playing in the subsequent 1908 FA Charity Shield.

References

1872 births
Year of death missing
20th-century deaths
Scottish footballers
Bristol City F.C. players
Grimsby Town F.C. players
Liverpool F.C. players
English Football League players
Scottish Junior Football Association players
Association football defenders
Bristol Rovers F.C. players
People from Port Glasgow
Footballers from Inverclyde
Millwall F.C. players
Queens Park Rangers F.C. players
Southern Football League players